Katharine Mary Craven Clark ( Hawtrey, November 8, 1926 – June 11, 2021) was a Canadian actress.

Hawtrey was born on November 8, 1926 and educated at Toronto's Trinity College. She began her career at Hart House Theatre and then went to England for a year's engagement with the Embassy Theatre in London. On her return, Hawtrey appeared in television plays for the CBC, before marrying English actor John Clark in 1956. They moved to New York City in 1959, where they had a son in 1963, naming him Jonathan Hawtrey Clark. They divorced in 1967 and she returned to Toronto with their son, appearing in many film and television productions. She is best remembered for her appearance in the 1980 film Funeral Home.

On Broadway, Hawtrey appeared in Love and Libel (1960).

Hawtrey died in Toronto on June 11, 2021, at the age of 94.

Partial filmography
 1971 Face-Off as Mother
 1978 High-Ballin' as Ma
 1979 Fish Hawk as Mary Bryan
 1979 Summer's Children as Mrs. Baines
 1980 Funeral Home as Maude Chalmers
 1980 Hank Williams: The Show He Never Gave as Gospel Woman
 1981 The Intruder as Crossing Guard
 1981 Silence of the North as Mrs. Miller
 1983 Videodrome as Matron
 1984 Police Academy as Surprise Party Lady (uncredited)
 1984 Mrs. Soffel as Peter's Secretary (uncredited)
 1986 Confidential as Doris
 1987 Police Academy 4: Citizens on Patrol as Poetess
 1987 Love at Stake as Mrs. Johnson
 1987 Goofballs as Miss Meyers
 1989 The Dream Team as Nurse
 1989 The Raccoons as Miss Primrose
 1992 Baby on Board as Matron #1
 1994 Trial by Jury as Clara, Juror
 1994 Trapped in Paradise as Rose Weyerhauser
 1995-2003 Little Bear as Granny (voice)
 1996 Two If by Sea as Lady With Dog
 1996 Kids in the Hall: Brain Candy as Wally's Neighbor
 1996 In Love and War as Grace Hall Hemingway
 1997 Critical Care as Dr. Butz's Secretary
 1997 The Secret Life of Algernon as Mrs. Binney
 1998 Dirty Work as Gladys
 1998 Urban Legend as Library Attendant
 1999 The Third Miracle as Wheelchair Mother
 2001 Dead by Monday as Hospital Cafeteria Lady
 2001 Focus as Mrs. Newman
 2002 Perfect Pie as English Teacher
 2002-2019 Max & Ruby as Grandma Bunny (voice)
 2006 .45 as Marge

See also
 List of show business families

References

External links
 
 
 The Peerage: Katharine Mary Craven Hawtrey

Hawtrey
Hawtrey
Actresses from Toronto
Canadian film actresses
Canadian people of English descent
Hawtrey
Trinity College (Canada) alumni
University of Toronto alumni
20th-century Canadian actresses
21st-century Canadian actresses